The 1982–83 Louisville Cardinals men's basketball team represented the University of Louisville during the 1982–83 NCAA Division I men's basketball season, Louisville's 70th season of intercollegiate competition. The Cardinals competed in the Metro Conference and were coached by Denny Crum, who was in his twelfth season.  The team played its home games at Freedom Hall.

The Cardinals won the Metro Conference tournament championship (their 4th), defeating Tulane 66–51.  Louisville defeated Kentucky 80–68 (OT) to win the NCAA tournament Mideast Regional and advance to the Final Four (their 6th) where they fell to eventual runner-up Houston 94–81. The Cardinals finished with a 32–4 (11–0) record.

Roster

Schedule

|-
!colspan=12 style=| Regular season

|-
!colspan=12 style=| NCAA Tournament

Sources

Rankings

NCAA tournament

Mideast region

Final four

References

Louisville Cardinals men's basketball seasons
Louisville
NCAA Division I men's basketball tournament Final Four seasons
Louisville
Louisville Cardinals men's basketball, 1982-83
Louisville Cardinals men's basketball, 1982-83